Jonathan Lajoie (born August 21, 1980) is a Canadian comedian, actor, rapper, singer, songwriter, director, record producer, musician and Internet celebrity from Montreal, Quebec. He gained fame mostly from his eponymous YouTube channel, posting comedic original songs (often as rapper characters, such as "Everyday Normal Guy") and comedy skits. Lajoie is also known for his role as Taco MacArthur on the FXX comedy series The League. Since 2016, he has released indie folk music under the moniker Wolfie's Just Fine, and has also contributed original music to TV shows and films.

Early life
Lajoie was born in Longueuil, Quebec, Canada and raised on the South Shore of Montreal. His father was Québécois and his mother is English-Canadian, and he is the third of nine children. Lajoie had formative experiences with music while attending a Pentecostal church and taking lessons. He graduated from Dawson College on the Island of Montreal. He completed a professional theatre program in 2002, after which he played in a band in the Montreal area for 3 years.

Career
Since early 2003, Lajoie has portrayed an English-Canadian musician named Thomas Edison in Radio-Canada's French-Canadian sitcom L'Auberge du chien noir. Lajoie began his career as a comedy musician in 2006. His performances include music, skits, and some comedy. Jon Lajoie has also released 4 studio albums, the first two featuring comedy music. His third and fourth albums eschewed comedy and were released under the moniker 'Wolfie's Just Fine'.

Television
Lajoie was cast in the FXX TV show The League as Taco MacArthur, a perpetually stoned and unemployed musician. Throughout the series, Lajoie performed songs written for the show.

He guest-starred as Caleb95 in one episode of the Williams Street original television show NTSF:SD:SUV::. In February 2022, LaJoie was featured in the Canadian edition of Amazon Prime's comedy competition LOL: Last One Laughing alongside Tom Green, Colin Mochrie, and Dave Foley among others.

Comedy Central Presents
Lajoie filmed an episode of Comedy Central Presents on November 7, 2009. It premiered on March 5, 2010.
The same special aired uncensored as part of Comedy Central's Secret Stash on June 6 featuring the world premiere of the video for his song "Pop Song".

Film
Lajoie was featured in the 2014 movie Let's Be Cops, as the boss of Damon Wayans, Jr.'s character. He was also featured in Quentin Dupieux's 2013 movie Wrong Cops as Officer Regan.

Music
Lajoie has published several novelty songs that he has made available on websites such as Funny or Die and YouTube. Though he initially hesitated to release a "serious album" due to his reputation as a comedic actor, in 2016, Lajoie released his first project of non-comedic music under the moniker Wolfie's Just Fine (whose name is a reference to Terminator 2: Judgment Day). The 10 track indie folk album titled I Remembered but Then I Forgot, released on April 8, was produced by Joe Corcoran and mixed by Phil Ek. The themes of the album predominantly draw on and recount Lajoie's formative childhood experiences. The song "A New Beginning" was inspired by Lajoie's experience watching his first horror movie Friday the 13th: A New Beginning, whose music video (directed by Lajoie and Brandon Dermer) is a tribute to the film by way of a shot-for-shot remake of a particularly impactful scene.

In 2018, Lajoie followed up with a Wolfie's Just Fine EP titled Perfection, Nevada, which was produced by Bright Eyes' Mike Mogis. Released on June 22, the release explores coming of age themes and features references to nineties films. Lajoie co-directed a music video for the single "Break My Back" featuring actor Xander Berkeley, as well as "Trying to Sleep" which pays homage to the film Tremors.

Songwriting for film and TV
LaJoie made his first foray into writing songs for film and television with his contributions to The League, for which he wrote and performed 14 songs over the course of the show.

In 2019, Lajoie wrote five songs for Warner Bros.' The Lego Movie 2: The Second Part, including "Catchy Song" (produced by Dillon Francis) and "Not Evil".

In 2022, Lajoie wrote three songs for the third episode of The Afterparty, with lyrical contributions by Jack Dolgen.

Filmography

Film

Television

Discography

Studio albums

Singles
 "High as Fuck" (2008)
 "Show Me Your Genitals" (2008)
 "I'm Inside Me!" (2010)
 "Very Super Famous" (2011)
 "The Best Song" (2011)
 "F**k Everything" (2011)
 "WTF Collective 3" (2011)
 "Song for the Students" (2012)
 "Broken-Hearted" (2012)
 "The Best Christmas Song" (2012)
 "Started as a Baby" (2013)
 "Miley, You're a Good Girl" (2013)
 "Merry Christmas Exclamation Point" (2013)
 "Please Use This Song" (2014)

Music videos

References

External links

Lajoie on Funny or Die 

1980 births
Living people
Canadian comedy musicians
Canadian YouTubers
Canadian male comedians
Canadian people of English descent
Canadian people of French descent
Canadian male rappers
Canadian stand-up comedians
Anglophone Quebec people
Quebecers of French descent
People from Longueuil
Musicians from Quebec
Dawson College alumni
21st-century Canadian rappers
Comedians from Quebec
21st-century Canadian male musicians